The Santa Lucia Highlands AVA is an American Viticultural Area located in Monterey County, California. It is part of the larger Monterey AVA, and located in the Santa Lucia Mountains above the Salinas Valley. The region enjoys cool morning fog and breezes from Monterey Bay followed by warm afternoons thanks to direct southern exposures to the sun.

The Santa Lucia Highlands is also home to one of the vineyards that Wine Enthusiast Magazine named a California "Grand Cru" vineyard, as a recognition of the locations that produce the highest-quality wine grapes. The Sleepy Hollow Vineyard is owned by Talbott Vineyards and grow grapes for Talbott wines.

The River Road Wine Trail runs along the length of this AVA.

References

American Viticultural Areas of California
Geography of Monterey County, California
Santa Lucia Range
American Viticultural Areas
1990 establishments in California